Sam Childers (born 1963), also known as the Machine Gun Preacher, is an American motorcyclist, author, and humanitarian. A former member of the Outlaws Motorcycle Club, Childers became well known after Dateline NBC's (Keith Morrison and Tim Sandler) story about him and his interactions with Joseph Kony (leader of the Lord's Resistance Army) in 2005 and now dedicates his life and resources to rescue children in the war zone of South Sudan. Childers and his wife Lynn founded and operate Angels of East Africa, the Children's Village Orphanage in Nimule, South Sudan, where they currently have around 185 children in their care. Childers also has orphanages and homes in Uganda and Ethiopia with another 160 children in his organisation's care.

In 2013, Childers received the Mother Teresa Award for Social Justice.

Early life 
Childers was born in Grand Forks, North Dakota, the son of Paul Childers, an ironworker and former Marine. Childers had two older brothers, Paul Jr. and George. He also had a sister, Donna, who died of a heart problem before she was a year old. While he was growing up, his parents moved the family from place to place, following construction projects.

In the spring of 1974, shortly before Childers turned 12, his family moved to Grand Rapids, Minnesota. Going into seventh grade he discovered cigarettes, marijuana, alcohol and heroin, which led to many years of drug addiction, drug dealing, and alcoholism. Childers also developed a love for motorcycles and the lifestyle that led him to become a member of the Outlaws Motorcycle Club.

Childers married a woman named Lynn before converting to Christianity, and had a daughter (Paige) and a son.

Career 
Childers converted to Christianity in mid-1992, with the help of his 1st wife, during a revival meeting at an Assembly of God church. That same evening Childers' pastor allegedly prophesied that he would go to Africa. At the end of 1997, Childers made his first trip to Sudan. In that first trip and the many that followed, he was exposed to the acts of the Lord's Resistance Army (LRA), which he described as atrocious.

Not long after his first trip to Sudan, Childers and his then wife Lynn founded the Angels of East Africa, the Children's Village in Southern Sudan. The Children’s Village currently houses and educates over 180 (figures update 2021) orphans, with over a thousand children rescued since its conception. The staff at the Children's Village are primarily Sudanese orphans and widows themselves.

Childers details the events of his life and his experiences in Africa in his book Another Man's War. The book bears the endorsement from South Sudan President Salva Kiir Mayardit: "The Reverend Sam Childers has been a very close friend to the government of South Sudan for many years and is a trusted friend."

In November 2009, Childers appeared on Debra Peppers' television show Outreach Connection in Quincy, Illinois. He revealed that he also rescues children abducted in northern Uganda.

In popular culture
In 2011, Relativity Media released a biopic about Childers entitled Machine Gun Preacher, which was based on Childers' book Another Man's War. The film was written by Jason Keller and directed by Marc Forster. The cast featured Gerard Butler in the title role, Michelle Monaghan as Childers' wife Lynn, and Michael Shannon as his best friend Donnie.

In 2014, a documentary with the same title was produced by Angels of East Africa, and filmed/edited by Australians Kevin Evans and Zac Simpson. It was released globally by Heritage Films in Australia and in North America by Vision Films (US).

Childers did a speaking tour of UK churches, organisations, businesses, rehab centers, and prisons in 2018. He was interviewed on video in Tamworth, UK.

Criticisms 
Childers has faced criticism over his actions and representation of himself. Foreign Policy cast doubt on Childers' stories of rescue, stating that "[i]t would take a miracle for all of Childers’s claims to be completely true." It also asserted that the operations of other aid workers are imperiled by Childers' actions. Additionally, the SPLA distanced itself from Childers, stating via a spokesman that "The SPLA does not know Sam Childers." 

In 2014, Childers' home and ministry properties were the subjects of a raid by the FBI and the IRS. In 2019, Childers was cleared of all charges by the FBI and the IRS. 

Other criticism includes allegations that orphanages started by Childers have been poorly run, and that Childers has not made a visit in years. A Vanity Fair profile compared Childers' demeanor toward some villagers as "bullying."

Assets 
Childers' NGO Angels of East Africa (AOEA) employs 300 people in a security company in Kampala, Uganda, and around 200 in his orphanages and other projects. He owns and operates training centers for displaced young people (mostly victims of war), restaurants, accommodations, a large truck stop and service center in northern Uganda, and a 1,000-acre farm in Nwoya.

References

External links 
 Official Movie Site for "Machine Gun Preacher"
 Angels of East Africa
 Interview with Sam Childers about Machine Gun Preacher (via archive.org)

1963 births
Living people
American humanitarians
American non-fiction writers
American Pentecostals
Outlaws Motorcycle Club
Lord's Resistance Army
People from Grand Forks, North Dakota